Valters is both a surname and a masculine given name. Notable people with the name include:

Kristaps Valters (born 1981), Latvian basketball player
Miķelis Valters (1874–1968), Latvian politician, diplomat and writer
Sandis Valters (born 1978), Latvian basketball player
Valdis Valters (born 1957), Latvian basketball player
Valters Āboliņš (born 1985), Latvian orienteer
Valters Frīdenbergs, Latvian musician, singer and TV-presenter
Valters Nollendorfs, board chair of the Museum of the Occupation of Latvia and a professor emeritus of German language and literature at the University of Wisconsin–Madison

See also
Valter (disambiguation)

Latvian masculine given names
Latvian-language surnames